The Fear of the Dark Tour was a concert tour by the heavy metal band Iron Maiden from 3 June 1992 to 4 November 1992.

The tour saw the band make a return headline appearance at the Monsters of Rock festival at Donington Park, which they headlined before a reduced crowd of 75,000 (the audience being capped after an incident in 1988 where two fans were crushed to death). The performance, which featured a guest appearance by then former guitarist Adrian Smith during "Running Free", was released audio and video formats.

The tour was also notable as the band attempted to play their first shows in Chile, but were forced to cancel after complaints from the Catholic Church.

Setlist
 "Be Quick or Be Dead" (from Fear of the Dark, 1992)
 "The Number of the Beast" (from The Number of the Beast, 1982)
 "Wrathchild" (from Killers, 1981)
 "From Here to Eternity" (from Fear of the Dark, 1992)
 "Can I Play with Madness" (from Seventh Son of a Seventh Son, 1988) (Added on 25 July 1992)
 "Wasting Love" (from Fear of the Dark, 1992)
 "Tailgunner" (from No Prayer for the Dying, 1990)
 "The Evil That Men Do" (from Seventh Son of a Seventh Son, 1988)
 "Afraid to Shoot Strangers" (from Fear of the Dark, 1992)
 "Fear of the Dark" (from Fear of the Dark, 1992)
 "Bring Your Daughter... to the Slaughter" (from No Prayer for the Dying, 1990) (Added on 25 July 1992)
 "The Clairvoyant" (from Seventh Son of a Seventh Son, 1988)
 "Heaven Can Wait" (from Somewhere in Time, 1986)
 "Run to the Hills" (from The Number of the Beast, 1982)
 "2 Minutes to Midnight" (from Powerslave, 1984)
 "Iron Maiden" (from Iron Maiden, 1980)
 "Hallowed Be Thy Name" (from The Number of the Beast, 1982)
 "The Trooper" (from Piece of Mind, 1983)
 "Sanctuary" (from Iron Maiden, 1980)
 "Running Free" (from Iron Maiden, 1980) (Added on 25 July 1992)
Notes:
"Die with Your Boots On" was played only in Argentina.

Tour dates

Festivals and other miscellaneous performances
This concert was a secret show under the name "The Nodding Donkeys"
This concert was a part of "Monsters of Rock"

Cancelled and rescheduled dates
 23 July 1992: Santiago, Chile, Estación Mapocho; cancelled following complaints from the Catholic Church.
 15 September 1992: San Sebastian, Spain, Velodrome; rescheduled to 17 September.
 17 September 1992: Caceres, Spain; cancelled.

References

External links
 Official website
 Fear of the Dark Tour Dates

Iron Maiden concert tours
1992 concert tours